This article gives an overview of the media in Washington, D.C., United States.

Newspapers

The Washington Post is the oldest-surviving and currently the most-read daily newspaper in Washington, with a strong reputation across the U.S. It is notable for exposing the Watergate scandal, among other achievements. The Washington Post Company has multiple media holdings, the Washington Post News Service with Bloomberg News, Fashion Washington, El Tiempo Latino (a Spanish-language publication), The Slate Group, The Daily Herald (in Washington state), as well as the education company Kaplan, Inc. The Washington Post emphasizes national and political news coverage but also covers regional and local stories. Headquartered in downtown Washington, the newspaper employs journalists at 11 regional bureaus in Maryland and Virginia and 14 international bureaus. Content is shared across titles within the Washington Post Company.

The daily Washington Times and the free weekly Washington City Paper also have readership in the District. On February 1, 2005, the free daily tabloid Washington Examiner debuted, having been formed from a chain of suburban newspapers known as the Journal Newspapers. The Washington Examiner converted to a political journalism website and weekly magazine in June 2013.

The weekly Washington Blade and Metro Weekly focus on gay issues, and the Washington Sun, the Washington Informer, and Washington Afro on African American issues. Bi-weekly Street Sense focuses on issues of homelessness poverty, and life on the streets. Other special-interest papers include Roll Call, a daily paper focused on politics.

Many neighborhoods in the District have their own community newspapers. Some of these include The Current Newspapers, which has editions serving Dupont Circle, Foggy Bottom, Georgetown, Chevy Chase and Upper Northwest, and a Capitol Hill paper called The Capitol Hill Current/Voice of the Hill. Additional papers include In-Towner (Dupont Circle, Logan Circle and Adams Morgan), Hill Rag (Capitol Hill), East of the River (Anacostia) and D.C. North (Northeast D.C.). In addition, several specialty newspapers serve the U.S. Congress; most notable are Roll Call from the Congressional Quarterly, The Hill, and Politico.

USA Today, the nation's most widely circulating newspaper, is headquartered in nearby Tysons, Virginia. USA Today is operated by Gannett, which is the largest newspaper publisher by circulation. Gannett is also headquartered in Tysons.

Television

As of 2022, the Washington metropolitan area is defined by Nielsen Media Research as the ninth-largest designated market area in the United States.

Terrestrial television

The first terrestrial television system in Washington D.C. was used in 1925, with a transmission from Wheaton, Maryland Charles Jenkins Laboratories
by Charles Francis Jenkins, three years later Charles Jenkins Laboratories started operations of W3XK, the first TV station in the United States, since then new television networks aired and operated in Washington D.C. This was the main TV medium until 1950's when first cable television systems started to operate. Terrestrial television in Washington D.C. aired in analog format using VHF (channels 2 to 13), UHF (channels 2 to 69).

Analog terrestrial television is starting to be shutting down in order to be replaced by digital format, both analog and digital television can be tuned or accessed with the use of traditional television antennas. Most Baltimore-area television stations can also be seen in the Washington region; besides being viewed clearly in the District, they can especially be seen in the suburbs of the Interstate 95 corridor between both cities.

Digital terrestrial television

From 2009 to 2022 US transitioned from analogical terrestrial television to digital terrestrial television, this television stations continue to be open to de public with traditional antennas without having to pay for cable television packages.

TV stations in Washington D.C. 

 DCTV (TV station) Washington D.C. Public Television with local content.
 NBC, WRC
 ABC, WJLA
 CBS, WUSA
 FOX,WTTG

The following networks maintain a significant presence in Washington:

 CNN 
 BBC, 
 CBC, 
 Al Jazeera, among others.

The following networks maintain a significant presence in Washington nearby areas:

 PBS is headquartered in Arlington, Virginia. 
 C-SPAN, 
 National Geographic Channel, 
 Discovery Channel are headquartered in the Washington area, 
 Tegna—owner of WUSA and other stations—is based in nearby Tysons, VA.

TV shows filmed in Washington D.C. area 

The following studio shows are filmed in the Washington area:
 CBS Evening News, 
 PBS NewsHour, 
 Meet the Press, 
 Face the Nation, 
 Fox News Sunday, 
 Pardon the Interruption, among others.

Cable television
Some of the companies that offer Cable TV in Washington D.C. are Direct TV, Astound Broadband and Dish.

Public, educational, and government access

Public, educational, and government access (PEG) on cable tv is provided by the Public Access Corporation of the District of Columbia on two channels simulcast to both local cable TV systems. One channel is devoted to religious programming, and the other channel provides a diversity of offerings. 

The District's two PEG Channels are DCTV, a non-profit media outlet that provides training and production opportunities to residents, and OCT TV-16, which provides information about government programs, services, and related opportunities. The District's Office of Cable Television, Film, Music and Entertainment (OCTFME) produces several channels of programming for DCTV, including the District Council Channel (DCC) and the District of Columbia Network (DCN), as well as the District Knowledge Network (DKN), which is co-produced with District of Columbia Public Schools.  The University of the District of Columbia also operates UDC-TV, a 24-hour cable television channel.

In addition to broadcast, cable channels MASN, NBC Sports Washington and WJLA 24/7 News are carried on cable systems in the Washington and Baltimore markets.

Radio

As of 2021, the Washington metropolitan area was the ninth-largest radio market in the United States. NPR, XM Satellite Radio, and Voice of America, the U.S. government's international broadcasting service, are headquartered in Washington. Urban One, the largest and most significant African American-owned media conglomerate in the country, is based in Washington and owns WOL, WKYS, WMMJ and WYCB. Based at American University, WAMU is the largest publicly-supported station in the market and the primary NPR member station for Washington. WTOP-FM is the largest all-news radio station in the U.S., owned by Hubbard Broadcasting and simulcast on a network of suburban FM signals; Hubbard also owns WFED, which features government talk and had origins as an internet-only station. C-SPAN additionally operates WCSP-FM, directly simulcasting the audio from their public access cable channels.

Because of the area's crowded airwaves, most of the student-run radio stations at D.C.-area colleges operate solely as webcasters, including Bowie State University's WBSU, the Catholic University of America's WCUA, George Mason University's WGMU, Georgetown University's WGTB, Montgomery College's WMCR, and American University's WVUA. WMUC at the University of Maryland, College Park, and WHBC at Howard University operate on FM and an FM HD Radio subchannel respectively.

Many major radio stations from Baltimore can be heard in the Washington metropolitan area; WAIW from Winchester, Virginia, can also be occasionally received in some sections of Northwest.

Internet media
Washington has over 60 online news outlets, in addition to websites run by the major print and broadcast media outlets. Washington ranks first out of the nation's largest designated market areas in household possession of a computer (82.9% of adults in the metro area) and Internet access (80% of adults online in the last 30 days). For news consumption, the city's major mainstream print and broadcast outlets command the most page views online, as well: WashingtonPost.com leads the pack with 10.6 million readers, an audience that extends beyond the metro region to include visitors from across the country. These mainstream outlets use their websites for various purposes. WashingtonPost.com, for example, features 107 blogs, including a section of the site called "All Opinions Are Local," which republishes selected content from area bloggers. Other types of partnerships include TV broadcaster WUSA's pairing with Metromix, an online entertainment guide that caters to a younger audience than those who tune into the station's news broadcasts.

Whether hyperlocal, citywide, or regional, blogs also play a significant role in DC's media environment. JDLand was among the early tranche of hyperlocal blogs to gain traction in Washington. Founded by Jacqueline Dupree in 2003, it covers developments in her neighborhood of Near Southeast. It averages one to two posts per day. DCist, a member of the Gothamist blog network, has the largest readership of any local blog in DC, with 1.7 million page views per month. The blog averages 15–20 posts per day and contains a mix of commentary, reader submissions, original reporting, and republished news. It covers a variety of neighborhoods across the District. "Prince of Petworth" is another blog with a well-developed following; it was founded in 2006 and has since expanded from its focus on the Northwest DC neighborhood of Petworth to include 34 neighborhoods across the city. In Southeast Washington, the leading blog is "And Now, Anacostia," which commands approximately 5,000 page views per month. Sites which focus on the arts, like Brightest Young Things and Jukebox DC, have been an integral part of DC's vibrant and growing music, entertainment and cultural scenes.

A joint TV-online venture, TBD, launched in August 2010 under the ownership of Allbritton Communications, which also owns Politico and broadcasters WJLA and News Channel 8, now rebranded as TBD TV. General Manager Jim Brady founded TBD after leaving WashingtonPost.com. Founding editor Erik Wemple came by way of local alt-weekly The Washington City Paper.

See also
 Media in Baltimore

References

External links
Washington, D.C. on American radio map (Radiomap.us)

Media
Washington